Biomarker may refer to:
 Biomarker (biomedical research), a measurable indicator of some biological state or condition
 Biomarker (organic geochemistry), a fossil organic molecule that provides evidence of past or present life
 Biomarker (cell), a cellular, biochemical or molecular alteration than can be used as a biomarker
 Biomarker (medicine), a measurable indicator of the severity or presence of some disease state
 Biomarker (petroleum), any of several complex organic compounds derived from formerly living organisms
 Biomarkers (journal), a peer-reviewed academic journal of biomarker research

See also